Yisroel Avrohom Portugal (or Israel Abraham Portugal) (June 2, 1923April 1, 2019) son of Rabbi Eliezer Zusia Portugal and his first wife, Sheina Rachel, was the Rebbe (Grand Rabbi) of Skulen in Brooklyn, New York. He was the last Holocaust era Rebbe to lead a Hasidic sect.

Early years, education, and World War II 
In his youth, he studied in Vizhnitz under the Vizhnitzer Rebbe, Rabbi Eliezer Hager. Before World War II began, Portugal and his father left their hometown of Sculeni in Moldova (the town from which derives the name of the Hasidic sect that they led) and went to Chernowitz in Ukraine, where they spent the Second World War.

Soviet occupation 
After the war, father and son went to Bucharest, Romania. The senior Portugal was arrested several times by the Soviets, who ruled Romania until 1968. In April 1959 the pair were arrested and accused of treason. After a big outcry and through the work of Rabbi Menachem Mendel Schneerson, Rabbi Eliezer Silver of Ohio, and other world Jewish figures, United Nations officials facilitated their release.    They were released in September 1959, and arrived in the U.S. in August 1960 after the U.S
State Department offered them U.S. citizenship.

Brooklyn 
Rabbi Portugal lived primarily in the Borough Park section of Brooklyn but spent some time including about half of the Jewish holidays in Williamsburg, Brooklyn where his father lived. He was widely sought after for his blessings and advice. He deprived himself of bodily pleasures by sleeping very little, not sleeping in a bed and eating no more than one meal a day. He was also known for his battles against modernities such as watching television and use of internet.

He encouraged shaving the scalp except for boys under three and unmarried girls.

He was a composer of Hasidic songs. He always (except on Shabbat and Jewish Holidays) carried with him a small tape recorder to record any new tune that would come to his mind. He composed thousands of songs. Most of them were forgotten after they were recorded, but many of them were sung at his tishen, and a handful of them have become classics in the Hasidic community.

Rabbi Portugal had close ties with many Hasidic rebbes. He headed the Chesed L'Avraham charity organization in Israel founded by his father, and was actively involved - traveling worldwide - in fundraising for it.

Following the death of his wife, Reizel (daughter of Rabbi Menachem Ze'ev Stern of Oberwischau), in 2005, he changed some of his practices, including traveling less and wearing his peyos hanging down rather than tied around his ears.

Family
Portugal's wife, Reizel, died in 2005.  Portugal had five sons and three daughters.

Sons
Rabbi Yeshaya Yaakov Portugal, Skulener Rebbe Shlit"a in Boro Park, used to live in Montreal, Canada – oldest son of Rabbi Yisroel Avrohom Portugal. Always had many followers of his own.
 Rabbi Meir Portugal – second son of Rabbi Yisroel Avrohom Portugal, Skulener Rebbe of Williamsburg, Brooklyn. 
Rabbi Ephraim Chayyim Yehuda Portugal, Skulener Rebbe Shlit"a in Monsey, New York – third son of Rabbi Yisroel Avrohom Portugal.
Rabbi Zvi Noach Portugal, Skulener Rebbe Shlit"a in Lakewood, New Jersey – fourth son of Rabbi Yisroel Avrohom Portugal.
Rabbi Shmuel Mordechai Portugal – youngest child of Rabbi Yisroel Avrohom Portugal, and Skulener Rav in Boro Park. Rabbi Shmuel Mordechai married his niece Sheina Rachel Stern (daughter of Rebbetzin Leah Libba, and oldest grandchild of Rabbi Yisroel Avrohom Portugal) in 1990 (an acceptable type of marriage according to Judaism).

Daughters
Rebbetzin Leah Libba – oldest child of Rabbi Yisroel Avrohom Portugal. Wife of Rabbi Chayyim Dov Stern, Skulener Rav of Bnei Brak, son of Rabbi Yitzhak Yehuda Stern of Bielitz .
Rebbetzin Chaya Sarah – second daughter of Rabbi Yisroel Avrohom Portugal. Wife of Rabbi Shimon Yoel Weinberger, Skulener Dayan, son of Rabbi Moshe Dov Weinberger.
Rebbetzin Nechamah – youngest daughter of Rabbi Yisroel Avrohom Portugal. Wife of Rabbi David Leib Klughaupt, head of Skulener Kollel of Boro Park, son of Rabbi Ya'akov Shlomo Klughaupt, son of Rabbi Levi Yitzhak Klughaupt.

Death

Rebbe Portugal died on April 1, 2019 at about 5:45 PM in Johns Hopkins Hospital surrounded by his family.  His funeral the following day as prescibed by Jewish law took place in Brooklyn was attended by over a  hundred thousand people.  The funeary proceedings were marked by a pair of incidents which each caused injury to a NYPD officer; the first in which an officer slipped and had his ankle broken by a hearse which ran over his leg and another where an out of fuel drone crashed down upon a police officer's head.   He was buried next to his father at the Viznitz Cemetery in Monsey, New York.  The Rebbe was 95.

References

External links
Video Clips of Grand Rabbi Avrohom Portugal of Skulen
New York Times obituary

Rebbes of Skulen
1923 births
2019 deaths
People from Borough Park, Brooklyn
Soviet emigrants to Romania
Romanian emigrants to the United States